This is a list of cities and towns in Qatar. Over 60 percent of residents of Qatar live in Doha, the capital.

Alphabetical list of cities and towns

Footnotes
1. Population: 138,573; area: 1,541.1 km; includes Fereej Al Soudan, Al Waab, Al Aziziya, New Fereej Al Ghanim, Fereej Al Murra, Fereej Al Manaseer, Bu Sidra, Muaither, Al Sailiya and Al Mearad.

2. Population: 24,722; area: 167.1 km; includes Leabaib, Al Ebb, Jeryan Jenaihat, Al Kheesa, Rawdat Al Hamama, Wadi Al Wasaah, Al Sakhama, Al Masrouhiya, Wadi Lusail, Umm Qarn and Al Daayen.

3. Population: 46,976; area: 80.6 km; includes Al Gharrafa, Gharrafat Al Rayyan, Izghawa, Bani Hajer, Al Seej, Rawdat Egdaim, and Al Themaid.

4. Population: 80,220; area: 459.0 km; includes Simaisma, Al Jeryan, Al Khor.

5. Population: 1,868; area: 0.9 km; includes Al Khulaifat and Ras Abu Aboud.

6. Population: 1,213; area: 36.0 km; includes Jabal Thuaileb, Al Kharayej, Lusail, Al Egla, and Wadi Al Banat.

7. Population: 85,906 ; area: 64.9 km; includes Fereej Al Asiri, New Fereej Al Khulaifat, Bu Samra, Al Mamoura, Abu Hamour, Mesaimeer and Ain Khaled.

8. Population: 22,459; area: 219.8 km; includes Al Thumama, Al Wukair, and Al Mashaf.

9. Population: 4,138; area: 0.2 km; includes Al Najada, Barahat Al Jufairi, and Fereej Al Asmakh.

10. Population: 2,782; area: 4.1 km; includes Al Qassar and Al Dafna.

11. Population: 22,168; area: 25.4 km; includes Leqtaifiya, Onaiza and Al Qassar.

12. Population: 4,996; area: 166.6 km; includes Madinat ash Shamal and Ar Ru'ays.

13. Population: 15,184; area: 2.7 km; includes Al Sadd, New Al Mirqab and Fereej Al Nasr.

13. Population: 5,558; area: 9.7 km; includes Jelaiah, Al Tarfa and Jeryan Nejaima.

14. Population: 128,574; area: 550.5 km; includes Al Thakhira, Ras Lafan, and Umm Birka.

15. Population: 76,291; area: 103.3 km; includes New Al Rayyan, Al Wajba, and Muaither.

16. Population: 1,009; area: 427.2 km; includes Al Zubarah and Abu Dhalouf.

17. Population: 1,970; area: 307.3 km; includes Fuwayrit, Ain Sinan and Madinat Al Kaaban.

18. Population: 60,509; area: 317.9 km; includes Al Kharaitiyat, Izghawa, Umm Salal Ali, Umm Salal Mohammed and Bu Fasseela.

19. Population: 20,416; area: 13.4 km; includes Al Luqta, Lebday, Old Al Rayyan, Al Shagub and Fereej Al Zaeem.

20. Population: 23,591; area: 18.1 km; includes Fereej Al Amir, Luaib, Muraikh, Baaya, Mehairja and Fereej Al Soudan.

21. Population: 4,886; area: 0.4 km; includes Fereej Mohammed bin Jassim and Mushayrib.

22. Population: 7,125; area: 0.5 km; includes Al Rufaa and Old Al Hitmi.

23. Population: 741; area: 0.5 km; includes As Salatah and Al Mirqab.

24. Population: 31,573; area: 1.5 km; includes Al Mansoura and Fereej Bin Durham.

25. Population: 14,725; area: 2.4 km; includes Madinat Khalifa North and Dahl Al Hamam.

26. Population: 21,066; area: 2.5 km; includes Fereej Bin Omran, New Al Hitmi and Hamad Medical City.

See also
 Municipalities of Qatar

References

Qatar, List of cities in
 
Cities